Châteauvieux is a commune in the Loir-et-Cher department, central France.

Population

Sights
The church of Saint-Hilaire was mostly built in the 13th century in the Plantagenet Gothic style characterised by the cross ribbed cup-shaped vaulting.

See also
Communes of the Loir-et-Cher department

References

Communes of Loir-et-Cher